Senator Flores may refer to:

Alfred Flores (1916–2009), Senate of Guam
Anitere Flores (born 1976), Florida State Senate
Pete Flores (born 1960), Texas State Senate

See also
Dean Florez (born 1963), California State Senate